Santa Elena de Uairén Airport  is an airport serving Santa Elena de Uairén, a city in the Venezuelan state of Bolívar.

The airport was under renovation in 2008 and it was re-opened on 29 April 2009 by Venezuelan President Hugo Chavez.

See also
Transport in Venezuela
List of airports in Venezuela

References

External links
OurAirports - Santa Elena
SkyVector - Santa Elena
OpenStreetMap - Santa Elena

Airports in Venezuela
Buildings and structures in Bolívar (state)
Airport